This is a list of French television related events from 2013.

Events
26 February - Sophie-Tith Charvet wins the ninth series of Nouvelle Star.
28 February - Laurène Bourvon wins the ninth and final series of Star Academy.
18 May - Yoann Fréget wins the second series of The Voice: la plus belle voix.
13 September - Anaïs Camizuli wins the seventh series of Secret Story.
23 November - Singer Alizée and her partner Grégoire Lyonnet win the fourth series of Danse avec les stars.
10 December - 23-year-old pole dancer Simon Heulle wins the eighth series of La France a un incroyable talent.

Debuts

Television shows

1940s
Le Jour du Seigneur (1949–present)

1950s
Présence protestante (1955-)

1970s
30 millions d'amis (1976-2016)

2000s
Nouvelle Star (2003-2010, 2012–present)
Plus belle la vie (2004–present)
La France a un incroyable talent (2006–present)
SamSam (2007-present)
Secret Story (2007–present)

2010s
Danse avec les stars (2011–present)
The Voice: la plus belle voix (2012–present)

Ending this year

Star Academy (2001-2008, 2012-2013)

Births

Deaths

See also
2013 in France